is a Japanese professional drifting driver, currently competing in the D1 Grand Prix series for Yokohama TOYOPET X 俺だっ!レーシング.

He developed a love for cars from an early age, his first was a Toyota Crown but to start with he was more interested in drag racing than drift. That soon changed as he found out how much it cost to make a fast drag car. One of his co-workers were interested in drifting and he decided to give it a go, even though his car was automatic and everyone said it would not work. He got hooked and found out how expensive drifting was often spending more than $800 a month on petrol. He used many different cars over this time from a Nissan Laurel (C33), Toyota Mark II and Toyota Chaser (JZX81) to a Toyota Cresta (JZX90), though all of them were 4-door. He chose these cars as he likes big displacement and big power, also the sound of straight 6 engines.

He works as the manager at a used car dealership called Kids Heart in the Aichi Prefecture. It is well known largely for the Nissan approved conversion of the Sileighty and many of the cars it sells are sought after by racers. He also runs a car graphics shop and website which he set up called T2 Koubou, as he enjoys working on computers and makes his own websites.

He started drifting professionally at the first round of the D1 Grand Prix, he was very happy that his family approved of this career choice, even more so when they come to cheer him on. In 2005 he was signed by Bee*Racing a tuning firm renowned for their Nissan Skyline GT-R (R32) known as the B324R. Since then his driving has come along a lot, finishing 9th in the 2006 season, 4th in the 2007 season, and gaining his first win in the third round of the 2008 series.

Complete Drifting Results

D1 Grand Prix

References

Sources
JDM Option
D1 Grand Prix

External links
Official Site
D1 Supporter profile

Japanese racing drivers
Drifting drivers
1975 births
Living people
D1 Grand Prix drivers